Feather Falls is a waterfall located on the Fall River, a tributary of the Middle Fork Feather River, within the Plumas National Forest in the Sierra Nevada mountain range in Butte County, eastern California, United States.

Description
The Feather Falls were recently measured to be 410 feet tall. This concurs with the USGS Brush Creek 7½" quadrangle information. They have been incorrectly claimed to stand 640 feet tall, and to be the 4th, 5th or 6th tallest falls in the United States, while actually not in the top 10.

The falls can be partially seen from the middle arm of Lake Oroville but are usually observed from a platform accessed by either of two trails maintained by the United States Forest Service. The nearby town of Feather Falls, California takes its name from the falls.

Ladybugs
The area at Frey Creek is a famous stopping point for migrating ladybugs. Millions of ladybugs can be seen at Frey Creek during the winter months. The ladybugs can usually be seen from November to March, but some sightings have been reported as early as August. The ladybugs stay for the winter, and then fly back down into the valley when spring comes.

Sources

External links

California Department of Water Resources
Shasta Cascade site
Backcountry pages
It is marked on this Wikimapia site showing Lake Oroville.

Waterfalls of California
Feather River
Landforms of Butte County, California
Plumas National Forest
Waterfalls of the Sierra Nevada (United States)
Plunge waterfalls